Chippewa Island is a First Nations reserve consisting of two islands in Twelve Mile Bay of Georgian Bay. The islands are adjacent to the Moose Deer Point First Nation. The islands are shared between the Beausoleil First Nation, the Chippewas of Georgina Island First Nation and the Chippewas of Rama First Nation.

References

External links
 Canada Lands Survey System

Ojibwe reserves in Ontario
Communities in the District Municipality of Muskoka